San Cipriano (Esperanto, Italian, Portuguese and Spanish for Saint Cyprian), may refer to several places:

 San Cipriano, Valle del Cauca, Colombian village in the department of Valle del Cauca
 San Cipriano, a subdivision of the Italian municipality of Roncade in the province of Treviso
 San Cipriano d'Aversa, Italian municipality in the province of Caserta
 San Cipriano Picentino, Italian municipality in the province of Salerno
 San Cipriano Po, Italian municipality in the province of Pavia
 San Cipriano (Madrid Metro), station on Line 9 of the Madrid Metro
 Church of San Cipriano, Toledo

Other language Wikipedias
 , a village of the Entre Ríos Province in Argentina 
 , populated place in Spain
 , populated place in Spain
 , populated place in Spain